Florida State Road 188 (FL 188) is a  state highway in Okaloosa County, Florida., that runs from Florida State Road 189 and Hurlburt Road in Wright to Florida State Road 85 and Fourth Avenue in Ocean City.

Major intersections

References

External links
FDOT Map of Okaloosa County (Including SR 188)

188
188